Gabriel Etinof (born 12 January 1996) is a French footballer who plays as a winger.

Career
On 23 May 2019, Etinof signed for Spanish club Real Zaragoza on a four year contract, but the move was declared void by the club on 13 June, as the player failed his medical. On 23 November 2019, he then joined SO Cholet. However, two and a half months later, on 12 February 2020, his contract was terminated by mutual agreement.

References

External links

1996 births
Living people
Association football wingers
French footballers
Ligue 2 players
Championnat National players
Championnat National 3 players
Stade Lavallois players
ASM Belfort players
SO Cholet players